The 2010–11 Dartmouth women's ice hockey team represented Dartmouth College in the 2010–11 NCAA Division I women's ice hockey season. In the regular season, the Big Green were 19–9–0 overall and 15–7–0 in the ECAC.

Offseason
July 23: Former Dartmouth player Sarah Howald is named new head coach of Hockey Canada’s National Women’s Under-18 Team.
September 15: Head coach Mark Hudak announced that senior defenseman Katie Horner is named the 64th captain in the history of the Big Green women's hockey program.
September 20: Big Green head coach Mark Hudak is named as one of two assistant coaches for the U.S. Women's Select Team. The team competes in the 2010 Women's Four Nations Cup from November 8–14, in St. Johns, Newfoundland.

Recruiting

Exhibition

Regular season
November 13–14: Sasha Nanji has two game-winning goals in two consecutive games. On November 13, she registers a hat trick versus Princeton as the Big Green triumph by a 3–2 mark in overtime. The following day, the Big Green plays Quinnipiac and Nanji has two points, including the game-winning goal in overtime in a 4–3 win.
For the week beginning January 14, 2011, Camille Dumais accumulates six points (three goals, three assists) in three victories. In a win versus Vermont, she registers one goal and two assists. Versus Union, she scores one goal, and then has a two point game versus RPI. Freshman goalie Lindsay Holdcroft wins three consecutive games. During the streak, she has a goals against average of 0.67, a save percentage of .947 and makes a total of 65 saves. She plays 180 minutes and registers a shutout versus RPI.
January 22, 2011: The Big Green shutout Rensselaer by a 3–0 mark at Thompson Arena, including two power play goals and an empty netter. It is the third straight win for Dartmouth, and improves the team to 12–8–0 overall and 8–6–0 in the conference. Lindsay Holdcroft earns the win and the shutout for the Big Green, making nine saves.
January 28–29: Lindsay Holdcroft makes 51 saves, allows only one goal and records a shutout in two victories. The Big Green have five straight wins as the squad moves into third in the ECAC. In the five victories, Holdcroft allows only three goals. In her rookie season, she has three shutouts.
February 11–12: Lindsay Holdcroft wins both games she played in. Versus St. Lawrence, she makes a career high 38 saves in a 3–2 win over St. Lawrence. The following day, she makes 19 saves in a 3–1 win over Clarkson.
February 19: The Dartmouth women's hockey plays its final game of the regular season and defeats Colgate 4–3. The Big Green took a 3–0 lead six minutes into the second period. Erica Dobos opens the scoring with her fifth goal of the season. Jenna Hobeika scores her ninth goal of the season three minutes into the second period, followed by Kelly Foley three minutes later for her 17th of the season. Camille Dumais scores the game-winning goal after a quick pass from senior Amanda Trunzo. Lindsay Holdcroft finishes with 24 saves for her 15th win of the season.

Standings

Schedule

Conference record

Player stats

Skaters

Goaltenders

Postseason

ECAC tournament

NCAA tournament

Awards and honors
Camille Dumais, ECAC MLX Skates Player of the Week (Week of January 25, 2011)
Lindsay Holdcroft, ECAC MLX Skates Rookie of the Week (Week of January 4, 2011)
Lindsay Holdcroft, ECAC MLX Skates Rookie of the Week (Week of January 25, 2011)
Lindsay Holdcroft, MLX Skates Goalie of the Week (Week of February 22, 2011)
 Lindsay Holdcroft, Dartmouth Female Athlete of the Week (Week of January 31, 2011) 
Lindsay Holdcroft, MLX Skates Goalie of the Week (Week of February 15, 2011)
Lindsay Holdcroft, MLX Skates Goalie of the Week (Week of February 22, 2011)
Sasha Nanji, Dartmouth, ECAC MLX Skates Player of the Week, (Week of November 16) 
Amanda Trunzo, ECAC MLX Skates Player of the Week, (Week of February 22, 2011)

All-Ivy honors
Kelly Foley, 2010–11 First Team All-Ivy
Amanda Trunzo, 2010–11 Second Team All-Ivy
Sasha Nanji, 2010–11 Honorable Mention All-Ivy
Lindsay Holdcroft, 2010–11 Honorable Mention All-Ivy

New England hockey awards
Mark Hudak, 2010–11 New England Women's CoachPlayer of the Year
Kelly Foley, 2010–11 New England Women's Division I All-Stars

References

Dartmouth Big Green women's ice hockey seasons
D
D
Big
Big